Swift or SWIFT most commonly refers to:
 SWIFT, an international organization facilitating transactions between banks
 SWIFT code 
 Swift (programming language)
 Swift (bird), a family of birds

It may also refer to:

Organizations
 SWIFT, an international organization facilitating transactions between banks
 Swift Engineering, an American engineering firm
 Swift & Company, a meat processing company
 Swifts (aerobatic team), a Russian aerobatic team

Transportation companies
 Swift Cooper, a British racing car manufacturer
 Swift Leisure, a British manufacturer of caravans
 Swift Motor Company, of Coventry, England
 Swift Transportation, a US trucking company

Places
 River Swift, a river in England
 Swift, Illinois, an unincorporated community in northeastern Illinois
 Swift County, Minnesota, a county in west-central Minnesota
 Swift, Minnesota, an unincorporated community in northern Minnesota
 Swift, Missouri, a ghost town in southeastern Missouri

Astronomy
 Swift (lunar crater), a crater on the Moon
 Swift (Deimian crater), a crater on Deimos
 5035 Swift (1991 UX), a Main-belt Asteroid
 Swift Gamma-Ray Burst Explorer, a NASA spacecraft in low-Earth orbit

Biology
 Swift (bird), a family of birds
 Swift butterflies, several genera in the skipper butterfly tribe Gegenini
 Swift lizards, iguanian lizards typically of the genus Sceloporus
 Snow swift lizards, of the iguanian genus Liolaemus
 Swift moth, of the family Hepialidae
 Swift fox, a species of North American fox

Computing and telecommunication
 Swift (distributed storage), OpenStack's distributed storage component
 Swift (programming language), a programming language developed by Apple Inc.
 Swift (parallel scripting language), a programming language for parallel computing developed at the University of Chicago and Argonne National Laboratory
 Swift (SoC) platform by Philips
 Swift, the ARM architecture CPU core in the Apple A6 and Apple A6X
 Swift, an XMPP client for Windows, Mac and Linux
 SWIFT – System for wireless infotainment forwarding and teledistribution: former abbreviation for DAta Radio Channel (DARC) subcarrier messaging standard

Transportation

Aircraft
 Aériane Swift, a Belgian sail plane design
 Comper Swift, a British 1930s single-seat sporting aircraft
 Globe GC-1 Swift, an American two-seat light airplane produced from 1946 to 1951
 Swift S-1, a Polish sailplane
 Supermarine Swift, a British jet fighter built after World War II

Land
 Leyland Swift, a British mid-sized bus
 Suzuki Swift, a car
 Skokie Swift, now known as the CTA Yellow Line, between Chicago and Skokie, IL, US
 Swift Bus Rapid Transit, in Snohomish County, Washington, US

Water
 Swift Boat (disambiguation)

Military
 HSV-2 Swift, a non-commissioned catamaran leased by the United States Navy
 Swift Boats, used by the US Navy in the Vietnam War
 Swift-class coastal patrol craft, patrol vessels built for the Republic of Singapore Navy
 HMS Swift, several ships of British Royal Navy
 Operation Swift, in the Vietnam War

Music
 Taylor Swift, American country and pop singer-songwriter
 Swift (rapper) (born Ondre Moore), US rapper in D12
 Miss Swift, character in Cardiacs

Sport
 Swifts F.C., a defunct English football club
 New South Wales Swifts, an Australian netball team

People
 Swift (surname)
 Jonathan Swift, Anglo-Irish writer
Taylor Swift, American singer and songwriter

Fictional characters
 Tom Swift, the central character in five series of books of juvenile science fiction and adventure novels, first appearing in 1910
 Tom Swift Jr., following in the tradition of the earlier Tom Swift novels, first appearing in 1954
 Swift Alternetter, a character in the film Cars
 Swift (character), comic-book character from The Authority
 Swift Wind, is fictional character from She-Ra: Princess of Power

Other uses
 Swifts, Darling Point, a mansion in Sydney, Australia
 Structured What If Technique, in risk management
 ISO 9362, the SWIFT/BIC code standard in banking
 Swift (textiles), tool used to hold a hank of yarn
 .220 Swift, a rifle cartridge
 Swift card, a card on public transport in Birmingham, United Kingdom
 Swift, a newsletter of the James Randi Educational Foundation
 Swift (comic), a Hulton Press publication related to Eagle

See also
 Swiftfuel, an ethanol-derived replacement for leaded gasoline airplane fuel
 Swift water rescue, a subset of technical rescue dealing in white water river conditions
 Swift v. Tyson, an 1842 case in the Supreme Court of the United States
 Justice Swift (disambiguation)